Jaggar is a surname. Notable persons with that surname include:

Alison Jaggar (born 1942), American feminist author
Dave Jaggar (born 1967), New Zealander computer scientist
Thomas Augustus Jaggar (1839–1912), American bishop
Thomas Jaggar (1871–1953), American volcanologist